This is a List of Belgian high Judges and National magistrates.

1st President of the Court of Cassation

Presidents of the Constitutional Court 
 1992-1993: Dieudonné André
 2007-2014: Marc Bossuyt
-2013:Roger Henneuse
 2013-2018: Jean Spreutels.

1st President of the Council of State 
-2014: Robert Andersen
 2014-2017: Yves Kreins
 2017-:Roger Stevens

1st Presidents of the Court of Appeal of Brussels

Public Prosecution

Prosecutor-General of the court of Cassation 
 1996-1999: Eliane Liekendael
 2014-2017: Patrick Duinslager.
 2017-current: Dirk Thijs.

Presidents of the College of Prosecutors-General 
 2015-2016: Johan Delmulle, (Brussels)
 2016-2017: Ignacio de la Serna, (Mons)
 2017-2018: Patrick Vandenbruane, (Antwerp)

Presidents of the Council of Senior Crown Prosecutors
 2017: Anne-Marie Gepts

Notes

 
Be